Innocence Lost is a Chinese lifestyle documentary show about child labour which produced by Mediacorp Channel U from Singapore. It is hosted by rotating persons, including Diana Ser, Joanna Dong and Danny Yeo on difference episodes. Lifestyle documentary show are introduce the employment of children in any work, the child from poverty family, who have lose their adolescence, interfered their ability to attend school in regularly, also dangerous and harmful to physically, mentally, socially and morally.

Synopsis lists 

Every episodes duration taken 46 minutes to telecast, the first season have 10 episodes was released on 19 April 2016, and the second season have 8 episodes was released on 7 February 2017.

Season 1

Season 2

References

See also 
 List of programmes broadcast by MediaCorp Channel U

Mandarin-language television shows
Mediacorp Chinese language programmes
Singaporean television series
Singaporean documentary television series
Child labour
Lifestyle
2016 Singaporean television series debuts
2017 Singaporean television series endings